The small-headed sea snake (Hydrophis macdowelli) is sea snake in the family Elapidae native to waters off northern Australia. It is a unique species in having a small head in relation to its body size. It grows up to a length of 1 metre.

References

Hydrophis
Reptiles described in 1983
Snakes of Australia